Luc Marquet (born 15 April 1970 in Lyon, Rhône) is a French volleyball player, who won the silver medal with the Men's National Team at the 2003 European Championships in Berlin, Germany. He earned a total number of 325 caps for the national side. He also competed in the men's tournament at the 1992 Summer Olympics.

International Competitions
1990 – World League (5th place)
1991 – World League (8th place)
1991 – European Championship (9th place)
1992 – World League (11th place)
1992 – Summer Olympics (9th place)
1993 – European Championship (9th place)
1997 – European Championship (4th place)
1999 – World League (7th place)
1999 – European Championship (6th place)
2000 – World League (7th place)
2001 – World League (6th place)
2001 – European Championship (7th place)
2002 – World League (7th place)
2002 – World Championship (bronze medal)
2003 – World League (10th place)
2003 – European Championship (silver medal)

References

External links
 L'Equipe Profile

1970 births
Living people
Sportspeople from Lyon
Volleyball players at the 1992 Summer Olympics
Olympic volleyball players of France
French men's volleyball players